Alan Marshall Clark (born January 9, 1948) is a former professional baseball umpire who worked in the American League from 1976 to 1999, and throughout both Major Leagues in 2000 and 2001, wearing uniform number 24 when the American League adopted them for its umpires in 1980, then retained the number when the NL and AL staffs were merged in 2000. Clark umpired 3,392 major league games in his 26-year career. He umpired in two World Series (1983 and 1989), two All-Star Games (1984 and 1995), five American League Championship Series (1979, 1982, 1987, 1992 and 1999), and three American League Division Series (1981, 1996 and 2000). Clark worked second base in the 1978 one-game playoff between the New York Yankees and the Boston Red Sox, which the Yankees won 5–4. He was the home plate umpire in Nolan Ryan's 300th career win on July 31, 1990.

Clark is Jewish and his family's surname was originally 'Sklarz' before being anglicized by his grandfather. He grew up wanting to be rabbi and made his bar mitzvah in an Orthodox synagogue.

Clark's father, Herb, was a sportswriter and the sports editor at The Times in Trenton, New Jersey. Raised in Ewing Township, New Jersey, Clark began umpiring while still a student at Ewing High School. He later graduated from Eastern Kentucky University.

Clark and fellow 1976 rookie Greg Kosc were the first American League umpires who never used the outside chest protector, which had been used since the league's formation in 1901 and was mandated in the 1920s by future Hall of Fame arbiter Tommy Connolly. In 1975, the year before Clark's hiring, the American League ruled umpires could use the outside protector or the National League standard inside protector, invented in the 1910s by another Hall of Fame umpire, Bill Klem. In 1977, the AL ruled all incoming umpires had to use the inside protector, an edict which affected new hires Steve Palermo and Durwood Merrill. Umpires active prior to 1977 using the outside (aka "balloon") protector could continue to use it until they retired or switched to the inside protector.

In 2001, Clark was fired by Major League Baseball after downgrading his first class airline tickets to economy class, thus either pocketing funds by selling extra tickets or to gain additional airline tickets for unapproved personal travel.  In 2004, he was sentenced to four months in jail and four months on house arrest after a memorabilia scheme resulted in a federal mail fraud conviction.

In 2014, he released a memoir entitled Called Out but Safe: A Baseball Umpire's Journey.

He now is a member at Ford's Colony Country Club in Williamsburg, VA, and lives in that development.

See also 

 List of Major League Baseball umpires

References

Further reading
Clark, Al, and Schlossberg, Dan, Called Out But Safe: a Baseball Umpire's Journey, Lincoln, Nebraska and London, England: University of Nebraska Press. . Illustrated hardcover, reissued as paperback in 2018, based on lengthy series of face-to-face interviews over two-year span. 
 This chapter in Ruttman's oral history, based on a January 18, 2009 interview with Clark conducted for the book, discusses Clark's American, Jewish, baseball, and life experiences from youth to the present.

External links
The Sporting News umpire card

1948 births
Living people
Major League Baseball umpires
Sportspeople from Trenton, New Jersey
Ewing High School (New Jersey) alumni
Eastern Kentucky University alumni
American sportspeople convicted of crimes
American people convicted of mail and wire fraud
People from Ewing Township, New Jersey
Prisoners and detainees of the United States federal government
Jewish American baseball people
American Jews from New Jersey